AQH share is a statistic that measures broadcast radio listenership.

Definition

 is an abbreviation for average quarter-hour persons, defined by Arbitron (now referred to as Nielsen Audio) as the average number of persons listening to a particular station for at least five minutes during a 15-minute period.
 is the percentage of those listening to radio in an Arbitron "market" (typically a metropolitan area) who are listening to a particular radio station.
Thus,  for a given station is mathematically expressed as:

Usage

AQH Share is most often used in conjunction with TSL (Time Spent Listening) to measure listenership in a market. While AQH measures the average number of listeners to the station, TSL tracks the length of time listeners are tuned continuously to the station.

External links
Glossary of Terms of the Radio Research Consortium

Market research
Radio broadcasting